Guilty Pleasures is an American food-themed television series that premiered on May 25, 2015 on Food Network. The series features chefs and other celebrity foodies exploring various types of food that are considered a guilty pleasure – "from a 24-layer chocolate cake, to a mega-bacon cheeseburger, to a filet mignon covered in fried oysters".

Episodes

Season 1 (2015)

Season 2 (2015–16)

Season 3 (2016)

References

External links 
 
 
 

2010s American reality television series
2015 American television series debuts
English-language television shows
Food Network original programming
Food reality television series
2016 American television series endings
Television series by Authentic Entertainment